Blodgett Canyon is located in southwestern Montana in the northwestern United States. It is one of more than two dozen scenic canyons deeply carved into the eastern flanks of the Bitterroot Range in Bitterroot National Forest. A trailhead is located at the mouth of the canyon, just west of the community of Hamilton and at an elevation of 4,000 feet (m).

 
Printz Ridge and Mill Point make up the northern wall, while Canyon Peak and Romney Ridge contribute to the southern wall. The upper (eastern) section of the canyon is part of the Selway-Bitterroot Wilderness Area.

In the year 2000, the forest in the lower section of Blodgett Canyon was extensively burned.

Geology
The canyons in this region were carved out by ice age glaciers, which left behind U-shaped valleys, moraines, hanging valleys, and steeply carved granite mountains, cliffs, and cirques, all of which are visible within Blodgett Canyon. The glacial valley is carved into granitic rocks of the Bitterroot Lobe of the Idaho Batholith, a Late Cretaceous to Paleocene intrusive body emplaced by subduction beneath the western margin of North America.

Recreation
Blodgett Canyon is known among the climbing community as one of the best big wall climbing spots in Montana and the region. The tallest route is the South Face of Flathead Buttress, at about 1,200 feet of sustained vertical.

References

Canyons and gorges of Montana
Landforms of Ravalli County, Montana
Bitterroot Range
Bitterroot National Forest